Jamal Young (born June 7, 1990) is an American football defensive end who is currently a free agent. He played college football at  Jones County Bobcats.

Tampa Bay Buccaneers

Young was signed as an undrafted rookie on May 5, 2015.

References

External links
Tampa Bay Buccaneers bio

Living people
American football defensive ends
Tampa Bay Buccaneers players
1991 births
People from McComb, Mississippi
Jones County Bobcats football players